M/V Taku is a Malaspina-class mainline vessel built for the Alaska Marine Highway System. The ship has been retired and was sold to a Dubai-based company for $171,000. The owner sought to sell the ferry internationally, and was unsuccessful, and it was last seen beached in Alang, India, to be scrapped.

History
Designed by Philip F. Spaulding  & Associates, constructed in 1963 by the Puget Sound Bridge & Dry Dock Company in Seattle, Washington, the M/V Taku is named after Taku Glacier which is located just southeast of Juneau, Alaska and has been in the ferry system for over forty years. In 1981, the Taku received a major refurbishment and was in service steadily until the summer of 2015 when she was laid up due to budget considerations. The AMHS subsequently announced that it would retire the vessel in preparation for sale or scrapping.

Role
As a mainline ferry, Taku served the larger of the inside passage communities (such as Ketchikan, Petersburg, and Sitka), its route primarily stayed between Ketchikan and Skagway in Southeast Alaska.

The M/V Taku was the largest of the three AMHS vessels able to serve the communities of Hoonah and Kake and because of this served as a critical component of providing transportation out of Hoonah and Kake after the "milk run" ferry, the  hit a rock and went into dry dock.

Amenities
The Takus amenities included a hot-food cafeteria; bar; solarium; forward, aft, recliner, movie, and business lounges; gift shop; 8 four-berth cabins; and 36 two-berth cabins.

Accidents and Incidents
 On April 23rd, 1963 the Taku struck a rock outside Petersburg in a minus tide.  She returned to service on May 3rd.
 On August 8th, 1963 two boys entered the wheelhouse when the Taku was preparing to leave Petersburg, and engaged the engines.  The resulting damage to the dock left the vehicle loading ramp out of commission for three months.
 On July 29th, 1970, the Taku ran aground on Kinihan Island, outside of Prince Rupert, Canada. All passengers on board were evacuated safely, and the cars were transferred to the BC Ferry MV Queen of Prince Rupert

Notes

References

External links
 Official Alaska Marine Highway System website
 M/S Taku.

Former Alaska Marine Highway System vessels
1962 ships
Ships built by Lockheed Shipbuilding and Construction Company